Paul Childéric Xavier Lizandier (2 December 1884 – December 1937) was a French runner who competed at the 1908 Summer Olympics. He won a team bronze medal in the 3 mile race, together with Louis de Fleurac and Joseph Dreher, and failed to reach the final of the 5 mile event.

In 1913, during World War I Lizandier deserted the French army and went to Romania. He later received a death sentence for insubordination, and was executed in December 1937.

References

1884 births
1937 deaths
French male long-distance runners
French male steeplechase runners
Olympic bronze medalists for France
Athletes (track and field) at the 1908 Summer Olympics
Olympic athletes of France
Medalists at the 1908 Summer Olympics
Olympic bronze medalists in athletics (track and field)
19th-century French people
20th-century French people